Xavier Trenchs (born 11 July 1981) is a Spanish field hockey player. At the 2012 Summer Olympics he competed with the Spain national field hockey team in the men's tournament.

References

External links
 

1981 births
Living people
Field hockey players at the 2012 Summer Olympics
Olympic field hockey players of Spain
Spanish male field hockey players